Comments by Celebs, or CBC, is a brand consisting of several social media accounts and a weekly podcast created by Emma Diamond and Julie Kramer that focuses on pop culture and entertainment news. The brand curates a collection of social media interactions between celebrities, emphasizing lighthearted interactions while trying to humanize celebrities. The account gained popularity through Instagram, although they also have Twitter, and Facebook accounts.

Background
Comments by Celebs was founded in April 2017. At the time, Instagram had recently changed its algorithm so that comments from verified accounts were visible first. This led Kramer and Diamond to create an Instagram account featuring a variety of comments and social media interactions between celebrities. Comments by Celebs' popularity grew after Kelly Ripa mentioned the account on the air on her show Live with Kelly and Ryan. In early 2018, they also added a watermark to their posts, which they claim helped to grow the account. The company is based in New York City.

Their account has also become a source of entertainment news due to the fact that they capture and instantly release information about which celebrities are interacting with one another. Because of this, they have built relationships with several entertainment reporters and celebrities, and many gossip bloggers have featured work from the accounts. To maintain positive relationships with celebrities, they request permission to post comments that may be considered questionable.  As a result of the popularity, they started various spinoff accounts with the handles @CommentsByBravo, @CommentsByBachelor, @CommentsByAthletes, @CommentsByInfluencers, and @CommentsByTikTok. While Kramer and Diamond run most of the accounts themselves, they hired someone to run @CommentsbyAthletes.

As a result of the popularity, they started various spinoff accounts with the handles @CommentsByBravo, @CommentsByBachelor, @CommentsByAthletes, @CommentsByInfluencers, and @CommentsByTikTok.

Diamond and Kramer are alumnae of Syracuse University, where they met and were in the same sorority. They bonded through a group chat which discussed Keeping Up with the Kardashians. Diamond holds a bachelor's degree in communications and rhetorical studies, while Kramer holds a Bachelors in psychology. At the time the account started, Diamond was pursuing a Masters in Social Work at Columbia University and Kramer was also planning on attending graduate school, but after the account's popularity grew, they deferred to pursue Comments by Celebs full-time. Both women are Jewish.  In 2019, they hired sorority sister and friend Isabel Greenberg to join as a partner and third member of the team.

Comments by Celebs was named as an honoree in the 2019 Webby Awards.

In 2020, they launched a line of merchandise at shop.commentsbycelebs.com  and partnered with @OverheardLA to launch @OverheardCelebs.

Podcast
Diamond and Kramer's podcast began in July 2018 as a partnership with Betches, with their first episode airing on 10 July 2018, and featuring Kelly Ripa as a guest host. Other celebrity guests have included  occasional celebrity guest hosts have included Katie Couric, Lisa Rinna, and Gary Janetti. In January 2019 they left Betches and partnered with Cadence13.

Kardashian Bonus Show
In February 2019, they started releasing weekly bonus podcast episodes which focus on the stars of Keeping Up With the Kardashians. The episodes discuss Kardashian news, scandals, and past and current episodes of the reality show. They covered the Jordyn Woods and Tristan Thompson scandal on the podcast through a series of episodes which they named "JORDYNGATE" and which began trending on the Apple podcast app.

Comments By Bravo episodes
In 2020, they launched the "Comments By Bravo" podcast, which highlights all things Bravo and Real Housewives, hosted by Emma Diamond and CBC's partner and Director of Communications, Isabel Greenberg. Guests have included Lisa Vanderpump, Meredith Marks, Carl Radke, Eboni Williams, Paige DeSorbo, Brooks Marks, and Hannah Berner.

List of episodes

Main episodes

Kardashian bonus episodes

Bravo bonus episodes

References

Instagram accounts
Social media accounts
Audio podcasts
2018 podcast debuts
Comedy and humor podcasts
Internet properties established in 2017
2017 establishments in New York City
American entertainment websites